= Roman Libbertz =

German painter

Roman Libbertz (born 1977 in Munich, West Germany), is a poet, writer and painter. His modeling career started with an assignment with Tommy Hilfiger. From 1999 to 2002 Libbertz was the event director of Germany's nightclub P1 in Munich. From 2000 to 2005 he organized the event series "Luna Lounge" all over Germany. In 2014 his photographs were showcased in the candela gallery. In 2015 he published his first novel Lieben lassen with co-author Ariane Sommer. In 2015 his photographs were showcased at 99 editions. In 2016 Starbucks used his short-story "Ihr Name war Starbucks" as giveaway. In 2017 he started to write a column for Die ZEIT. Apart from his career Libbertz has received media attention for his marriage to Jessica Libbertz. Currently he is working on a satirical business novel about a clothing company. (via Süddeutsche Zeitung)

== Creative career ==
In 2007 Libbertz showcased his paintings at the gallery Holzstrasse. In 2008 he published his first book of short stories Triebjagd oder 31 gute Nachtgeschichten (The Hunt or 31 stories from last night). In 2009 Mit Liebe (With Love) his first book of poems was published by Regia House. In 2010 Mit mehr Liebe (With More Love) followed. He completed his love triangle with 63 x Liebe in November 2012. In 2011 he was television host at Lettra on Sky Television Germany. His single debut "Donnervoegel" was released in August 2012 at Swings Records. In 2012 he produced the music video for "Iggy and the German Kids" for their song "So Hard". It was his first time directing. In 2012, his paintings were showcased at the gallery Hegemann in Munich and gallery Jutta Kabuth in Gelsenkrichen. In 2013 he wrote and directed his first short film called Nullgefühl. In an interview by the Süddeutsche Zeitung he claimed to admire the director Louis Malle. In 2014 his photographs were showcased in the candela gallery. In 2015 he published his first novel Lieben lassen with co-author Ariane Sommer. In 2015 his photographs were showcased at 99 editions. In 2016 Starbucks used his short-story "Ihr Name war Starbucks" as giveaway. In 2017 he started to write a column for Die ZEIT. Apart from his career Libbertz has received media attention for his marriage to Jessica Libbertz. Currently he is working on a satirical nightlife novel. (via Süddeutsche Zeitung) He is also one of the authors of the famous wine blog from 9 to wine.
